The men's discus throw was an event at the 1996 Summer Olympics in Atlanta, Georgia. There were 40 competitors from 30 nations. The maximum number of athletes per nation had been set at 3 since the 1930 Olympic Congress. The final was held on July 31, 1996. The event was won by Lars Riedel of Germany, the nation's first victory in the men's discus throw (though both East and West Germany had previously won). Belarus won two medals in its debut, with Vladimir Dubrovshchik earning silver and Vasiliy Kaptyukh taking bronze.

Background

This was the 23rd appearance of the event, which is one of 12 athletics events to have been held at every Summer Olympics. The returning finalists from the 1992 Games were silver medalist (and 1988 gold medalist Jürgen Schult of Germany, bronze medalist Roberto Moya of Cuba, fourth-place finisher Costel Grasu of Romania, fifth-place finisher Attila Horváth of Hungary, ninth-place finisher David Martínez of Spain, eleventh-place finisher Vésteinn Hafsteinsson of Iceland, and twelfth-place finisher Anthony Washington of the United States. Lars Riedel of Germany, who had not made the final in 1992, had won the last three world championships (and would win, take third place, and win again in the next three).

Belarus, Croatia, the Czech Republic, Mongolia, Slovakia, Slovenia, Ukraine, and Uzbekistan each made their debut in the men's discus throw. The United States made its 22nd appearance, most of any nation, having missed only the boycotted 1980 Games.

Competition format

The competition used the two-round format introduced in 1936, with the qualifying round completely separate from the divided final. In qualifying, each athlete received three attempts; those recording a mark of at least 62.50 metres advanced to the final. If fewer than 12 athletes achieved that distance, the top 12 would advance. The results of the qualifying round were then ignored. Finalists received three throws each, with the top eight competitors receiving an additional three attempts. The best distance among those six throws counted.

Records

Prior to the competition, the existing world and Olympic records were as follows.

Lars Riedel's fifth and sixth throws in the final both exceeded the old record, reaching 69.40 metres and 69.24 metres.

Schedule

All times are Eastern Daylight Time (UTC-4)

Results

Qualifying

Final

See also
 1994 Men's European Championships Discus Throw (Helsinki)
 1995 Men's World Championships Discus Throw (Gothenburg)
 1997 Men's World Championships Discus Throw (Athens)
 1998 Men's European Championships Discus Throw (Budapest)

References

External links
 Official Report
 Results

D
Discus throw at the Olympics
Men's events at the 1996 Summer Olympics